Polyrhizon is a genus of fungi in the family Venturiaceae; according to the 2007 Outline of Ascomycota, the placement in this family is uncertain.

References

External links 

 Polyrhizon at Index Fungorum

Venturiaceae